The Burning Bed is both a 1980 non-fiction book by Faith McNulty about battered housewife Francine Hughes, and a 1984 TV-movie adaptation written by Rose Leiman Goldemberg. The plot follows Hughes' trial for the murder of her husband, James Berlin "Mickey" Hughes, following her setting fire to the bed he was sleeping in at their Dansville, Michigan home on March 9, 1977, and thirteen years of physical domestic abuse at his hands.

Plot
On March 9, 1977, Francine Hughes and her three children arrive at the Dansville, MI, police station, where she turns herself in, after setting her husband, James Berlin “Mickey” Hughes, on fire in their home. Public defender Aryon Greydanus is appointed as Francine’s attorney and tries to gain insight into her motive. Initially reluctant, Francine recounts her life and the events leading up to the murder. 

In 1964, sixteen-year-old Francine meets Mickey Hughes, and the two marry shortly. Mickey begins displaying signs of jealousy and anger and physically abuses Francine, often in the presence of his parents. The abuse escalates over the years, and circumstances worsen with Mickey’s alcoholism. Francine divorces Mickey and takes their three young children. Mickey tries to convince Francine to get back together with him, promising he has changed his ways, but Francine refuses. After learning Mickey has been involved in a serious car accident, rendering him severely injured, Francine agrees to care for him temporarily in his parent’s home; however, the situation eventually traps Francine into a domestic partnership with him. As the children get older, Francine takes business courses at a community college, much to Mickey’s disapproval. Mickey’s abuse becomes relentless, and Francine tries to leave numerous times, only for Mickey to follow her and threaten her into returning. She also seeks help from the police, family courts, and Mickey’s family, but to not avail. 

As the case goes to trial, Francine testifies about the horrifying instances of abuse she suffered from Mickey over the years and what happened the day of the murder: 

Francine returns home late from school, after giving a classmate a ride home, enraging a drunken Mickey. He refuses to allow her to cook TV dinners for the family and beats her. He then orders her to quit school, and when Francine refuses, he destroys her school books and forces her to burn them. Later that night, at dinner, Mickey beats her again and knocks the food on the floor. He rubs Francine’s face in the mess and orders her to quit school again. A defeated Francine agrees. Afterward, Mickey rapes her and falls asleep in a drunken stupor. Francine goes to the garage and obtains a can of gasoline, which she pours over Mickey’s body. She takes her children to the car and drives away as the house becomes engulfed in flames. 
As the jury returns from deliberation, Francine is found not guilty by reason of temporary insanity, and Francine is embraced by her children.

Film adaptation
Having adapted the book into a made-for-television movie, Goldemberg's screenplay, The Burning Bed, premiered on NBC on October 8, 1984. Directed by Robert Greenwald, the film starred Farrah Fawcett as Francine Hughes and Paul Le Mat as Mickey Hughes.

The house was in Rosharon, Texas.

The movie was filmed in El Monte, California.

Cast
 Farrah Fawcett as Francine Hughes
 Paul Le Mat as James Berlin "Mickey" Hughes
 Richard Masur as Aryon (Arjen) Greydanus
 Grace Zabriskie as Flossie Hughes
 Penelope Milford as Gaby
 Christa Denton as Christy Hughes, age 12
 James T. Callahan as Berlin Hughes
 Gary Grubbs as District Attorney
 David Friedman as Jimmy Hughes, age 10
 David Andrews as Wimpy Hughes
 James Hampton as Police Witness
 Virgil Frye as Virg
 Dixie K. Wade as Hazel Moran
 Heather Rich as Christy age 6
 Justin Gocke as Jimmy age 4
 Elizabeth Lyn Fraser as Nicole Hughes
 Jeremy Ross as Judge Hotchkiss

Ratings
The movie premiered with a household share of 36.2 ranking it the 17th highest rated movie to air on network television and NBC's highest rated television movie.

Critical response
Television critic Matt Zoller Seitz in his 2016 book co-written with Alan Sepinwall titled TV (The Book) named The Burning Bed as the 7th greatest American TV-movie of all time, writing that "The film was a landmark in terms of content, depicting domestic violence as an unambiguous horror and a human rights violation". Seitz also praised the performance of Fawcett as "one of the finest in the history of TV-movies".

References

External links
 
 
 
 

1984 crime drama films
1984 television films
1984 films
American crime drama films
American courtroom films
American docudrama films
1980s feminist films
Films about alcoholism
Films about arson
Films about domestic violence
Films based on non-fiction books
Films directed by Robert Greenwald
Films set in Michigan
Films set in the 1960s
Films set in the 1970s
Films shot in Texas
NBC network original films
Crime films based on actual events
Violence against women in the United States
1980s legal films
American feminist films
1980s American films